Taryn Young is the Director of the Centre for Evidence-based Health Care and Head of the Division of Epidemiology and Biostatistics at Stellenbosch University. She is a member of the Academy of Science of South Africa. Professor Young has co-authored over 100 peer-reviewed scholarly articles. Her research has focused on summarising and interpreting medical research.

External links
 Taryn Young on ResearchGate
 Taryn Young on Google Scholar

References

Living people
South African public health doctors
Women public health doctors
University of Cape Town alumni
Stellenbosch University alumni
1972 births
Academic staff of Stellenbosch University